Blue Owl Capital (also known as Blue Owl)  is an American alternative investment asset management firm.  It is currently listed on the New York Stock Exchange under the ticker symbol: "OWL".

The firm is headquartered in New York City with additional offices in Hong Kong, Singapore, and elsewhere.

History 
In December 2020, it was announced there would be a merger between Owl Rock Capital Group and Dyal Capital Partners. The two firms would combine with a special-purpose acquisition company, Altimar Acquisition Corp to form Blue Owl. The deal was valued at $12.2 billion which included a $1.5 billion commitment from investors such as ICONIQ Capital, Federated Hermes and Liberty Mutual.

On May 19, 2021, the transaction was completed and Blue Owl was listed on the New York Stock Exchange.

On October 18, 2021, Blue Owl acquired Oak Street, a private equity real estate firm for $950 million.

On December 13, 2021, Blue Owl acquired Ascentium Group, a business development office based in Hong Kong. This was done as part of its plans to expand in Asia.

In October 2022, Bloomberg reported Blue Owl intended to expand the size of its offices in Greenwich, Connecticut and had opened an office in New Jersey.

Business overview 

Blue Owl has three business units: Dyal Capital, Oak Street and Owl Rock.

Dyal Capital 
Dyal Capital was formed in 2011 by Michael Rees and Sean Ward who were both formerly of Lehman Brothers. Since inception, the firm has been part of Neuberger Berman which currently retains a stake in Blue Owl as a result of the merger.

Dyal Capital provides financing to hedge funds and private equity firms by acquiring minority interests in them. Firms it has acquired interests in include:

 Bridgepoint Group
 Clearlake Capital
 Golub Capital
 H.I.G. Capital
 ICONIQ Capital
 JANA Partners LLC
 KPS Capital Partners
 MBK Partners
 Providence Equity
 Silver Lake
 Sixth Street Partners
 Starwood Capital Group
 Vista Equity Partners

In July 2021, Dyal Capital acquired minority stakes in the NBA teams, Phoenix Suns and Sacramento Kings.

In March 2022, Blue Owl announced it planned to hold an IPO for Dyal Capital on the London Stock Exchange.

Funds

Oak Street 
Oak Street was founded in 2009 by Marc Zahr and James Hennessey.

Oak street is private equity real estate firm based in Chicago that focuses on structuring sale-leasebacks.

In August 2021, Oak Street acquired The Bow in Calgary for $1.2 billion. In September 2022, Oak Street and GIC agreed to acquire Store Capital for $14 Billion.

Owl Rock 
Owl Rock was founded in 2016 by Doug Ostrover (co-founder of GSO Capital Partners), Marc Lipschultz (former KKR partner) and Craig Packer (formerly of Goldman Sachs).

The firm is a middle market Private credit direct lending firm that deals with credit investments. Its clients include George Soros, Brown University and the state of South Carolina.

References

External links 
 

2020 establishments in New York (state)
American companies established in 2020
Companies listed on the New York Stock Exchange
Financial services companies based in New York City
Financial services companies established in 2020
Investment companies based in New York City
Private equity firms of the United States
2021 initial public offerings
Publicly traded companies based in New York City